Brandzeia is a genus of flowering plants in the legume family, Fabaceae. It belongs to the subfamily Detarioideae.

Species
This is an incomplete list of species in this genus.
 Brandzeia filicifolia
 Brandzeia rubriflora Drake

Detarioideae
Taxa named by Henri Ernest Baillon
Fabaceae genera